Kaubenheim is a village in Germany, part of Ipsheim, Bavaria.

The Lutheran chapel St. Michael, completed in 1717, is located in Kaubenheim.

References 

Villages in Bavaria
Neustadt (Aisch)-Bad Windsheim